The Sunbeam Bomber was a prototype single-engined, single seat bomber aircraft of the First World War. Only one example flew as the type proved to be unsuccessful and was abandoned.

Design and development
Following the outbreak of the First World War, the Sunbeam Motor Car Company became a major supplier of licence-built aircraft for the Royal Naval Air Service (RNAS), in addition to its existing work as a designer and builder of aero-engines and motor vehicles. In November 1916, a requirement for a single-engined, single-seat bomber was issued on behalf of the RNAS, and when Sunbeam decided to design an aircraft to respond to this specification, it received an order for two prototypes from the Admiralty.

Sunbeam's design was a two-bay biplane of conventional tractor configuration. The aircraft's fuel tanks were located in the fuselage at the aircraft's centre of gravity, which resulted in the pilot's cockpit being well behind the wings (and  behind the nose). Racks for three 100 lb (45 kg) bombs were fitted under the wings, while a single forward-firing synchronized Vickers machine gun was mounted above the aircraft's engine.

The first prototype, serial number N515 first flew at Castle Bromwich in late 1917, but exhibited a number of problems. The Puma engine, despite being ordered in large numbers, was unreliable and suffered from severe vibration, which considerably delayed service testing. When eventually formally tested, in August 1918, it proved to be heavier and carry fewer bombs than the private venture Sopwith B.1 of similar concept. The second prototype was abandoned before it was completed, and no orders were placed either for the Sunbeam or the Sopwith, which were incapable of defending themselves against attacking enemy fighters Existing two-seat aircraft such as the Airco DH.4 better met the RNAS's (and later the Royal Air Force's) requirements.

Specifications

See also

Notes

References

 

1910s British bomber aircraft
Military aircraft of World War I
Single-engined tractor aircraft
Biplanes
Aircraft first flown in 1917